Capitol Hill's mystery soda machine was a Coke-themed vending machine in Capitol Hill, Seattle, Washington, United States that was in operation from at least the early 1990s until its disappearance in 2018. It is unknown who stocked the machine.

Description
A drink could be chosen using one of the "? mystery ?" buttons and the dispensed drinks were rare cans that were either ordinarily unavailable in the United States or had not been in circulation since the 1980s. Examples of the beverages were Mountain Dew White Out, raspberry-flavored Nestea Brisk, Hawaiian Punch, and Grape Fanta. It was rumored that Vanilla Coke, Black Cherry Frescas, and Sunkist Cherry Limeade were also available. The owner of the business closest to the machine, a locksmith, claimed to have no knowledge of who operated it.

History

In January 2018, the same month Seattle passed its sugary drink tax the cost for a drink from the machine rose from $0.75 to $1.00.

In June 2018, the machine mysteriously disappeared and a message was posted to the machine's Facebook page stating "Going for a walk, need to find myself. Maybe take a shower even." A note was taped to the rail next to where the machine used to be: "Went for a walk". During that time the soda machine's Facebook page featured humorous photoshopped images of the soda machine in a forest and at Machu Picchu.
A local landscape architect reported that the machine was moved "due to the addition of a bus stop in the right away of the sidewalk."

References

2018 disestablishments
Capitol Hill, Seattle
Drinks
Individual physical objects
Open problems
Unexplained disappearances
Vending machines